United Microelectronics Corporation (UMC) is a Taiwanese company based in Hsinchu, Taiwan. It was founded as Taiwan's first semiconductor company in 1980 as a spin-off of the government-sponsored Industrial Technology Research Institute (ITRI).

Overview
UMC is best known for its semiconductor foundry business, manufacturing integrated circuits wafers for fabless semiconductor companies. In this role, UMC is ranked behind competitor TSMC. It has four 300 mm fabs, one in Taiwan, one in Singapore, one in China, and one in Japan.

UMC is listed on the Taiwan Stock Exchange as 2303. UMC has 12 manufacturing facilities worldwide, employing approximately 19,500 people.

UMC is a significant supplier to the automotive industry.

History

 On May 22, 1980, UMC was spun off from the Industrial Technology Research Institute and was formally established as the first private integrated circuit company in Taiwan.
 1983: TMC starts a joint research project with US based Vitelic.
 1985
 UMC was officially listed on the Taiwan Stock Exchange (code: 2303). It was the first listed semiconductor company in Taiwan. At that time, Morris Chang was its chairman. 
 UMC sets up a subsidiary, Unicorn Microelectronics Corporation (also abbreviated UMC), in the Silicon Valley to improve access to technology, signing joint research agreements with Mosel (later Mosel Vitelic) and Quasel.
 1995: UMC decided to transform from an IDM company with its own products to a professional pure-play foundry.
 1996: Spun off its IC design units to establish MediaTek, Novatek, ITE Technology, Faraday Technology, AMIC Technology, and Davicom.
 1999: Fab 12A 12-inch wafer fab in Tainan Science Park was officially established.
 2000:
 Lists on the New York Stock Exchange (code: UMC) as Taiwan's first semiconductor company to do so.
 Produces the first chips using copper process technology and the first 0.13 micron ICs in the semiconductor industry.
 2004: 12-inch wafer fab in Singapore enters mass production.
 2008: Listed as a constituent stock on the Dow Jones Sustainability Index (DJSI) for the first time.
 2010: 30th anniversary of the company.
 2013: Fully acquires "Hejian Technology Wafer Fab" in Suzhou, China.
 2015: USCXM 12-inch wafer fab located in Xiamen, Fujian Province, China was officially established.
 2017: 28 nm mass production begins at USCXM in Xiamen, China.
 2019: Fully acquired Japan-based Mie Fujitsu Semiconductor.
 2020: Reached a plea agreement with the U.S. Department of Justice to resolve a 2018 trade secrets case.

U.S. Indictment and guilty plea 
The United States Department of Justice indicted UMC and Chinese firm Fujian Jinhua in 2018, alleging that they conspired to steal intellectual property from U.S. company Micron. In October 2020, UMC and the U.S. Department of Justice reached a plea agreement, with UMC pleading guilty to one count of receiving and possessing a stolen trade secret and agreeing to pay a fine of $60 million. UMC’s plea and Plea Agreement resolved the 2018 trade secrets case brought against UMC by the U.S. Department of Justice. As part of the Plea Agreement, DOJ agreed to dismiss the original indictment against UMC, including allegations of conspiracy to commit economic espionage and conspiracy to steal multiple trade secrets from Micron Technology, Inc. (“Micron”), patent-related allegations, and alleged damages and penalties of $400 million USD to $8.75 billion. The one trade secret at issue in the guilty plea and Plea Agreement related to older technology that had been in mass production worldwide for several years. DOJ also dismissed a related civil case against UMC. Aside from the fine amount, UMC has no further financial obligations to DOJ. The Plea Agreement also provides that UMC will cooperate with DOJ and will be subject to a three-year term of non-supervised probation.

Fab list

Processes

See also
 List of semiconductor fabrication plants
 List of companies of Taiwan

Notes

References
 The Foundation for Taiwan's IC Manufacturing Industry, Jack Chang, 1987
 Manufacturing Miracles: Paths of Industrialization in Latin America and East Asia; Gary Gereffi, Donald L. Wyman; Princeton University Press, 14 juli 2014

External links 

 
 Yahoo! Finance Profile of UMC
 Reuters Profile
 UMC Japan

Manufacturing companies based in Hsinchu
Manufacturing companies established in 1980
Companies listed on the Taiwan Stock Exchange
Semiconductor companies of Taiwan
Foundry semiconductor companies
Taiwanese brands
Taiwanese companies established in 1980
Companies listed on the New York Stock Exchange